Huilong Township is a township of Mianning County in the north of Liangshan Yi Autonomous Prefecture in southwestern Sichuan province, China, located  southwest of the county seat as the crow flies. , it has six villages under its administration.

See also 
 List of township-level divisions of Sichuan

References 

Township-level divisions of Sichuan
Mianning County